Cale Young Rice (December 7, 1872 – January 24, 1943) was an American poet and dramatist. He was professor of English at Cumberland University. His opera, Yolanda of Cyprus, was widely received.

Life and career
Rice was born in Dixon, Kentucky, to Laban Marchbanks Rice, a Confederate veteran and tobacco merchant, and his wife Martha Lacy. He was a younger brother of Laban Lacy Rice, a noted educator, author, and president of Cumberland University. Cale Rice grew up in Evansville, Indiana, and Louisville, Kentucky. He was educated at Cumberland University where he was a member of the Theta chapter of Kappa Sigma Fraternity and at Harvard (A.B., 1895; A.M., 1896).

On December 18, 1902, Rice was married to the popular author Alice Hegan Rice; they worked together on several books. The marriage was childless. In 1910, they built a house at 1444 St. James Court, where they lived for 40 years.

Cale Rice's poems were collected and published in a single volume, The best poetic work of Cale Young Rice, by his brother, Laban Lacy Rice (1870-1973).

His birthplace in Dixon is designated by Kentucky State Historical Marker 1508, which reads:

Rice adapted his play Yolanda of Cyprus into an opera libretto for Clarence Loomis; the resulting work was premiered on September 25, 1929 in London, Ontario, under the baton of Isaac Van Grove, and featured Charles Kullman.  The production was directed by Vladimir Rosing. The opera later received the Bispham Memorial Medal Award.

Death
Rice committed suicide by gunshot during the night of January 24, 1943, at his home in Louisville a year after his wife's death due to his sorrow at losing her.

Works

Verse
 From Dusk to Dusk (1898) 
 With Omar (1900) 
 Song Surf (1900)
 Nirvana Days (1908) 
 Many Gods (1910) 
 At the World's Heart (1914)

Plays
 Charles di Tocca (1903) 
 Yolanda of Cyprus (1906)
 A Night in Avignon (1907) 
 The Immortal Lure (1911) 
 Porzia (1913)

Collection
 Collected Plays and Poems (two volumes, 1915)

Other works
 Youth's Way. New York, The Century Co., 1923.
 A New Approach to Philosophy. Lebanon, Tenn: The Cumberland University Press, 1943.

References

External links

 
 
 
 
 Guide to the Cale Young Rice papers, 1927–1939 housed at the University of Kentucky Libraries Special Collections Research Center
 Rice family page
 Rice family home on Dixon, KY site

1872 births
1943 suicides
American male poets
Harvard University alumni
Writers from Louisville, Kentucky
People from Webster County, Kentucky
Writers from Evansville, Indiana
Suicides by firearm in Kentucky
Cumberland University alumni
American male dramatists and playwrights
19th-century American poets
20th-century American poets
20th-century American dramatists and playwrights
Poets from Kentucky
Poets from Indiana
19th-century American dramatists and playwrights
19th-century male writers
20th-century American male writers